Brassia caudata is a species of orchid. It is found widespread across the warmer parts of the Western Hemisphere, reported from southern Mexico (Chiapas, Campeche, Quintana Roo, Tabasco, Veracruz), Central America, southern Florida, Greater Antilles, Trinidad, northern South America. It is also known by the common names tailed Brassia, spider orchid and cricket orchid.

References

External links
IOSPE orchid photos
Encyclopedia of Life, spider orchid, Brassia caudata
Atlas of Florida Vascular Plants, spider orchid, cricket orchid,  Brassia caudata
Santa Barbara Orchid Estate

caudata
Plants described in 1759
Orchids of Florida
Orchids of Belize
Orchids of Mexico
Orchids of Central America
Flora of Cuba
Orchids of Haiti
Flora of the Dominican Republic
Orchids of Jamaica
Flora of Trinidad and Tobago
Orchids of South America
Flora without expected TNC conservation status